Metropolitan and non-metropolitan counties are one of the four levels of subdivisions of England used for the purposes of local government outside Greater London and the Isles of Scilly. As originally constituted, the metropolitan and non-metropolitan counties each consisted of multiple districts, had a county council and were also the counties for the purposes of Lieutenancies. Later changes in legislation during the 1980s and 1990s have resulted in counties with no county council and 'unitary authority' counties with no districts. Counties for the purposes of Lieutenancies are now defined separately, based on the metropolitan and non-metropolitan counties.

In 2009 and 2019, there were further structural changes in some areas, resulting in a total of 83 metropolitan and non-metropolitan counties. These 83 counties collectively consist of 283 districts or district-level subdivisions, i.e. 36 metropolitan boroughs and 247 non-metropolitan districts.

Current metropolitan and non-metropolitan counties of England 

 † Metropolitan county (no county council).
 ‡ Non-metropolitan county with no county council.
 ** Non-metropolitan county with county council.
 * Non-metropolitan county that is also a unitary authority.

Metropolitan counties

The metropolitan counties are Greater Manchester, Merseyside, South Yorkshire, Tyne and Wear, West Midlands and West Yorkshire. The counties typically have populations of 1.2 to 2.8 million.

The county councils of these were abolished in 1986, but the counties themselves still exist legally. They are used for some administrative and geographic purposes, and are still ceremonial counties. Most of the powers that the former county councils had were devolved to their metropolitan boroughs, which are now in effect unitary authorities; however, some functions (such as emergency services, civil defence and public transport) are still run jointly on a metropolitan-county-wide basis.

Non-metropolitan counties

Shire counties
The unofficial term "shire county" is sometimes used to refer to a two-tier non-metropolitan county, that is, a non-metropolitan county that has more than one district. Its name does not need to have "shire" in it.

There are 24 such counties:

Cambridgeshire, Cumbria, Derbyshire, Devon, East Sussex, Essex, Gloucestershire, Hampshire, Hertfordshire, Kent, Lancashire, Leicestershire, Lincolnshire, Norfolk, North Yorkshire, Nottinghamshire, Oxfordshire, Somerset, Staffordshire, Suffolk, Surrey, Warwickshire, West Sussex, Worcestershire.

All have county councils. This definition of "shire county" excludes Berkshire because it has no county council. The counties are less urbanised and have populations of 109,000 to 1.4 million. Under local government reforms coming into effect in 2009, the number of such counties was reduced. The non-metropolitan counties of Bedfordshire and Cheshire were each split into two separate non-metropolitan counties, while Cornwall, County Durham, Northumberland, Shropshire and Wiltshire became unitary authorities.

Unitary authorities

Unitary authorities are areas with only one council, and there are 58 in total.

52 are coterminous with a non-metropolitan county, 43 of which are defined as counties with a single district council and no county council: Bath and North East Somerset, Bedford, Blackburn with Darwen, Blackpool, Bournemouth, Christchurch & Poole, Brighton and Hove, Bristol, Central Bedfordshire, Cheshire East, Cheshire West and Chester, Darlington, Derby, East Riding of Yorkshire, Halton, Hartlepool, Kingston upon Hull, Leicester, Luton, Medway, Middlesbrough, Borough of Milton Keynes, North East Lincolnshire, North Lincolnshire, North Northamptonshire, North Somerset, Nottingham, Peterborough, Plymouth, Portsmouth, Redcar and Cleveland, Rutland, South Gloucestershire, Southampton, Southend-on-Sea, Stockton-on-Tees, Stoke-on-Trent, Swindon, Telford and Wrekin, Thurrock, Torbay, Warrington, West Northamptonshire, York. The other 9 are technically counties with a county council and no district councils, but the effect is the same: Buckinghamshire, Isle of Wight, Cornwall, Dorset, Durham, Herefordshire, Northumberland, Shropshire and Wiltshire

The remaining 6 unitary authorities (West Berkshire, Reading, Wokingham, Bracknell Forest, Windsor and Maidenhead, Slough) form Berkshire, however they are not non-metropolitan counties, as the non-metropolitan county of Berkshire still exists albeit without a county council; this is a unique situation.

Exceptions in England
The Local Government Act 1972 created the system of metropolitan and non-metropolitan counties and districts, but specifically excluded two parts of England from the new system, a situation which exists to the present.

Greater London
Greater London was created in 1965 by the London Government Act 1963 as a sui generis administrative area, with the Greater London Council functioning as an upper-tier local government. It consists of 33 local authority districts and spans the area which was prior made up of the County of London, most of Middlesex, and parts of other neighbouring administrative counties. In 1972, no metropolitan or non-metropolitan counties or districts were created in this area. However, the council was abolished along with the metropolitan county councils in 1986.

In 1994, Greater London was designated as one of nine regions of England, each of which had a government office up until they were abolished 2011. Since 2000, Greater London has had an elected Assembly and Mayor responsible for strategic local government. In the other eight regions, plans for elected assemblies were abandoned (although they had regional chambers with limited functions between 1999 and 2010), leaving London as the only region with a conterminous authority.

The area does however include two counties for the purposes of lieutenancies (informally known as ceremonial counties): the county of Greater London (which covers the 32 London boroughs) and the City of London (which covers the City, that is, the original walled "square mile").

Isles of Scilly
The Isles of Scilly are, like Greater London, not covered by the system of metropolitan and non-metropolitan counties. The Council of the Isles of Scilly remains a district council (constituted in 1890, by way of the Local Government Act 1888) with county council powers (granted by the Isles of Scilly Order 1930) and is therefore a sui generis unitary authority. Some functions, such as health and economic development, are shared with Cornwall Council, and the islands form part of the ceremonial county of Cornwall.

History
The current system of metropolitan and non-metropolitan counties came into effect on 1 April 1974 and replaced the administrative counties and county boroughs, which were abolished at that time. Greater London was created in 1965 under separate legislation, which also led to small parts of Middlesex transferred to Surrey and Hertfordshire.

In the 1990s, a new type of non-metropolitan county was created: the unitary authority, which combines the functions and powers of county and district. The existing non-metropolitan counties became known as shire counties to distinguish them from the unitary authorities.

Local Government Act 1972

By the late 1960s, it had become obvious that the structure of local government in England and Wales needed reforming.  Harold Wilson's Labour government set up the Redcliffe-Maud Commission to produce proposals for wholesale reform.

The report proposed that for most of England the two-tier structure be abolished, and replaced with a system of 58 unitary authorities, which would generally ignore the previous administrative boundaries in favour of changes that made geographic sense - a total redrawing of the map. In the South of Lancashire, North East of Cheshire and the Birmingham area, there would be 3 metropolitan areas, with 20 district authorities.

These proposals were opposed by the Conservative Party opposition led by Edward Heath. They won the 1970 general election, and set to work defining their own scheme. This scrapped the concept of unitary authorities (even for existing county boroughs) – the entire area of England and Wales was to be divided into uniform counties and districts. In England the new divisions were to be largely modelled on the existing counties with quite radical reforms put forward, even in some non-metropolitan areas.

Despite reassurances from the government that nobody's loyalties were expected to change as a result of the local government reform, many changes did incur significant local opposition. Most of the radical changes were withdrawn. One aspect the government stood firm on was the mergers of small counties. Campaigns for the continuation of Rutland and Herefordshire were unsuccessful, although due to its special geographic circumstances, the Isle of Wight was permitted to retain a separate county council, as opposed to being reunified with its historic county of Hampshire.

The Local Government Act was passed in 1972, and defined the English counties and metropolitan districts, but not the non-metropolitan districts. These were set by a Boundary Commission that had already begun work.

The metropolitan counties were composed as follows:

Merseyside - including Liverpool, south-west Lancashire, along with the northern part of the Wirral Peninsula from Cheshire
Greater Manchester - the Manchester urban area along with many surrounding towns
South Yorkshire - based upon the Sheffield-Rotherham area in the West Riding of Yorkshire
Tyne and Wear - the Tyneside conurbation based on Newcastle-upon-Tyne in Northumberland, along with Sunderland in County Durham
West Midlands - Birmingham conurbation in north-west Warwickshire, along with the Black Country in Staffordshire and Worcestershire, and Coventry in Warwickshire
West Yorkshire - Leeds-Bradford area in the West Riding

Other significant changes were:

Avon formed from northern Somerset, southern Gloucestershire, and Bristol and Bath
Cleveland formed from southern Durham and northern part of the North Riding, focusing on the Teesside conurbation along with Guisborough and Hartlepool
Cumbria was formed from Westmorland, Cumberland and parts of Lancashire and Yorkshire
Herefordshire and Worcestershire were merged into Hereford and Worcester
Humberside formed from eastern Yorkshire and northern Lincolnshire
Huntingdon and Peterborough was annexed by Cambridgeshire
Rutland was merged into Leicestershire as a district
Vale of White Horse, including Berkshire's former county town Abingdon, was ceded to Oxfordshire, as was the area around Wallingford and Didcot now comprising the western half of the South Oxfordshire District
Bournemouth was moved from Hampshire to Dorset, to join its sister town of Poole
Slough was moved from Buckinghamshire to Berkshire, as was Eton to join its sister town of Windsor
Warrington was moved from Lancashire to Cheshire
The Forest of Bowland was moved from the West Riding of Yorkshire to Lancashire

The changes were adopted by the Royal Mail for the purposes of postal addresses wherever they were able, with the notable exceptions of Hereford and Worcester and Greater Manchester. Humberside was divided for this purpose into North Humberside and South Humberside.

Map 1974–1996

Abolition of metropolitan county councils

In 1986, the county councils of the metropolitan counties and the Greater London Council were abolished by Margaret Thatcher's government following disputes with central government, but the counties themselves remained legally in existence.

Local Government Act 1992

The 1990s led to the restoration of county boroughs under a new name, unitary authorities, which radically changed the administrative map of England. The changes were carried out in several waves.

On 1 April 1995, the Isle of Wight became a single unitary authority.  It had previously had a two-tier structure with an Isle of Wight County Council, Medina Borough Council and South Wight Borough Council.  Also on this day, two small areas were ceded from Surrey and Buckinghamshire to Berkshire, giving it a border with Greater London.

On 1 April 1996, the unpopular counties of Avon, Humberside and Cleveland were abolished and their former area divided into unitary districts.  Also at this time, the city of York was expanded and separated from North Yorkshire.

On 1 April 1997, the districts of Bournemouth, Darlington, Derby, Leicester, Luton, Milton Keynes, Poole, Portsmouth, Rutland, Southampton, Stoke-on-Trent and Swindon (based on the former Thamesdown district) became unitary authorities.  Also, the districts of Brighton and Hove were merged to form the new unitary authority of Brighton and Hove.

On 1 April 1998, Blackburn with Darwen (based on the former Blackburn district), Blackpool, Halton, Nottingham, Peterborough, Plymouth, Southend-on-Sea, Telford and Wrekin (based on the former Wrekin district), Torbay, Thurrock and Warrington became unitary authorities. Also, the districts of Rochester-upon-Medway and Gillingham were merged to form the new unitary authority of Medway, and the county of Hereford and Worcester was abolished and replaced by the unitary authority of Herefordshire and the shire county of Worcestershire. Berkshire was split into six unitary authorities, but not formally abolished.

2009 structural changes

In April 2009, the following changes were made to the non-metropolitan counties:

The effect was that Bedfordshire and Cheshire became ceremonial counties that do not correspond to a non-metropolitan county of the same name.

2019–2023 changes

Since 2019, the following changes have been made to the non-metropolitan counties:

The following changes have been made by legislation but are not yet fully implemented:

See also
Counties of England
Subdivisions of England
Ceremonial counties of England
List of local governments in the United Kingdom

References

External links

England geography-related lists
Local government in the United Kingdom
Metropolitan and non-metropolitan counties
Counties of England